Sharpes is a census-designated place (CDP) in Brevard County, Florida. The population was 3,411 at the 2010 United States Census. It is part of the Palm Bay–Melbourne–Titusville Metropolitan Statistical Area.

Geography
Sharpes is located at  (28.441281, -80.761019).

Demographics

As of the census of 2000, there were 3,415 people, 1,478 households, and 947 families residing in the CDP. The racial makeup of the CDP was 91.92% White, 3.54% African American, 0.88% Native American, 0.64% Asian, 0.70% from other races, and 2.31% from two or more races. Hispanic or Latino of any race were 2.34% of the population.

There were 1,478 households, out of which 23.8% had children under the age of 18 living with them, 46.8% were married couples living together, 12.6% had a female householder with no husband present, and 35.9% were non-families. 28.7% of all households were made up of individuals, and 11.9% had someone living alone who was 65 years of age or older.  The average household size was 2.30 and the average family size was 2.77.

In the CDP, the population was spread out, with 21.4% under the age of 18, 6.0% from 18 to 24, 28.1% from 25 to 44, 24.8% from 45 to 64, and 19.7% who were 65 years of age or older.  The median age was 42 years. For every 100 females, there were 97.7 males.  For every 100 females age 18 and over, there were 95.8 males.

The median income for a household in the CDP was $27,692, and the median income for a family was $33,825. Males had a median income of $27,500 versus $19,231 for females. The per capita income for the CDP was $16,039.  About 12.6% of families and 18.7% of the population were below the poverty line, including 16.1% of those under age 18 and 14.8% of those age 65 or over.

Economy
The Florida Power and Light "Cape Canaveral" plant is located here. In 2010, the plant razed its two 45-year-old landmark towers, each , each weighing . The destruction paved the way for gas-fired plants. In 2011, construction was started on $1.1 billion gas-fired plants. Up to 600 workers will be employed for the construction.

The Brevard County Jail Complex is located in Sharpes. It is owned and maintained by the Board of County Commissioners and operated by the Brevard County Sheriff's Office. The jail is accredited through the Florida Corrections Accreditation Commission. The main jail opened in 1986 with beds for 386 inmates. Currently the Jail Complex routinely houses over 1,800 inmates daily with 1,321 permanent inmate beds. There has been a jail as long as there has been a sheriff and a county court. The jail was formerly located in Titusville, Florida, in the Courthouse complex. In 2013, the jail re-introduced chain gangs as a deterrent on crime in a pilot project. Ex-convict Larry Lawton was critical of this, saying a better use of law enforcement resources would be to combat drug addiction because he says it is a "contributing factor" to criminal activity.

The Brevard Correctional Institution is located west of the county jail. Despite its name, it is operated by the state. It was built in 1977. It houses up to 1,000 inmates. It employs 238 people. In 2010, it cost $30.8 million to operate. In 2011, it needed $6.2 million to repair. The state decided to close it.

References

External links 

 Brevard County Sheriff's Office

Census-designated places in Brevard County, Florida
Census-designated places in Florida
Populated places on the Intracoastal Waterway in Florida